Mingus Mapps is an American professor and politician in Portland, Oregon. He was elected to the city council in November 2020, winning 56% of the vote, making him the third Black man to serve as a Portland city commissioner.

Education

Mapps graduated from Reed College and received his Ph.D. in government from Cornell University.

Career
Mapps, a former political science professor, promised during his campaign to reform Portland's police department, pass policies that protect renters, expand Portland Street Response teams in all parts of the city to reduce homelessness, and pay for more mental health services.

He is currently the commissioner in charge of the Water Bureau, the Bureau of Environmental Service and the Bureau of Emergency Communications.

See also
 List of Cornell University alumni
 List of Reed College people

References

Living people
African-American people in Oregon politics
Politicians from Portland, Oregon
Year of birth missing (living people)
Cornell University alumni
Reed College alumni
Oregon Democrats
21st-century African-American people